Kevin Daniel Kilbane (born 1 February 1977) is a former professional footballer who played as a left winger or full back. Kilbane won 110 caps for the Republic of Ireland national team, fourth behind only Robbie Keane, Shay Given and John O'Shea as the most capped Irish player of all time.

Kilbane played for several English clubs, including Everton, West Bromwich Albion, Sunderland, Wigan Athletic, Huddersfield Town and Derby County (the last two on loan from Hull City) and Coventry City.

Towards the end of his career Kilbane concentrated on forging a media career. He now works as an analyst for Virgin Media Television (Ireland), BBC Radio 5 Live, BBC Match of the Day, Football Focus, Final Score, Ireland's Newstalk Radio Off The Ball Football Show and most recently for Canada's The Sports Network (TSN) and their coverage of FIFA World Cup 2022.

Club career

Early career
Born in Preston, Lancashire, Kilbane made his professional debut at his hometown club, Preston North End, after making his way through the youth system at Deepdale. It was not long before his performances began to attract attention from other clubs, and he was sold to West Bromwich Albion for a fee of £1 million in 1997. Kilbane was Albion's first £1 million player, breaking a club transfer record which had stood since 1979.

Sunderland
In December 1999, Peter Reid's Sunderland paid £2.5 million for the left winger, making him the third most expensive club signing at the time. His impact was immediate; coming off the bench on his debut against Southampton, Kilbane crossed for Kevin Phillips to score the match winner. However, this was to be Sunderland's last win until March 2000, a loss in form which came to be known as "The Curse of Kilbane".

In spite of his best efforts on the pitch, he soon became a target for the Black Cats fans to vent their frustrations, as the team's drop in form under Peter Reid continued and the team were relegated from the Premiership. In the summer of 2002, he gave the travelling Sunderland fans a two-fingered salute on a pre-season tour of France. His days at the Stadium of Light seemed numbered.

Everton
On the last day of the transfer window at the start of the 2003–04 season, Kilbane moved to Everton for just under £1 million, where he was reunited with David Moyes. The Goodison Park fans would appreciate his commitment and re-invigorate Kilbane as a player. In return, he displayed great versatility which resulted in him being deployed right across the midfield, at left back or even as a support striker, as well has his preferred left-wing position. On 26 August 2006, during his last game for Everton against Tottenham Hotspur, he was sent off by referee Mark Halsey for two bookable offences.

Wigan Athletic
On 31 August 2006, Kilbane signed a three-year deal with Wigan Athletic for an estimated fee of £2 million. On 15 April 2007, he scored his first goal for Wigan Athletic with a powerful header in the 3–3 draw against Tottenham Hotspur. This was his first goal at club level since October 2004. He then scored his second goal for Wigan with a looping header over Robert Green's head from Ryan Taylor's cross as Wigan went on to beat West Ham 1–0. Kilbane played most of his second season in the unfamiliar left back role, but still managed to win Wiganer.net's Player of The Season Award.

Hull City

With limited first team opportunities at Wigan due to the emergence of Maynor Figueroa and with his contract set to expire in the summer, Kilbane transferred to Hull City on 15 January 2009 for an undisclosed fee believed to be in the region of £500,000, signing a two-and-a-half-year deal with the Yorkshire club. He scored his first goal for the club against Burnley on 10 April 2010.

Huddersfield Town (loan)
On 1 January 2011, as the transfer window reopened, Kilbane joined Football League One side Huddersfield Town on loan until the end of the season, mainly as a replacement for the injured Damien Johnson. He made his debut the same day in the 2–2 draw against Carlisle United at Brunton Park. He scored his first goal for the club in the 4–2 win over Walsall at the Bescot Stadium on 15 January 2011. After signing for Huddersfield, he helped the team to a club record 26 league games unbeaten, before their eventual 3–0 defeat in the playoff final to Peterborough.

Derby County (loan)
On 2 August 2011, Kilbane joined Derby County on a six-month loan deal from Hull. Kilbane played 10 times for Derby, scoring one goal in a 3–0 win against Doncaster Rovers on 20 August 2011, however Kilbane's loan was cut short on 29 November 2011 due to a back injury.

Coventry City
On 2 July 2012 Kilbane joined Coventry City on an initial one-year deal. On his debut against Dagenham & Redbridge in the League Cup on 14 August 2012, he scored a late winner from the penalty spot. On 16 August 2012, Kilbane was named captain for the 2012–13 Coventry City's season. He made his final professional appearance as a substitute in a 2–1 defeat at Brentford on 24 October 2012 before announcing his immediate retirement on 8 December 2012.

International career

While still a youth player at Preston, Kilbane was called up to the England u-18 squad but declined as he had always wished to represent Ireland. Kilbane is an Irish citizen since birth, as both his parents are Irish, and he made his international debut against Iceland on 6 September 1997. He was chosen as part of Mick McCarthy's squad for the 2002 FIFA World Cup in Japan and South Korea. The team did relatively well at the tournament, progressing to the knockout stage. They lost to Spain in a penalty shootout when Iker Casillas saved Kilbane and David Connolly's penalties.

Kilbane scored his first international goal in nearly four years with a magnificent strike against the Czech Republic on 11 October 2006. He scored his 8th international goal on 7 September 2010 against Andorra, the first competitive goal for the Republic of Ireland at the new Aviva Stadium.

Kilbane won his 100th cap against Montenegro on 14 November 2009, and on 2 March 2010, he and Shay Given became the joint most-capped players for the Republic of Ireland, both earning their 103rd caps in a 2-0 friendly defeat to Brazil. As of 4 June 2011, Kilbane played his 66th consecutive competitive international game (a run stretching back to 1999); only England's Billy Wright has achieved a longer unbroken run in competitive international football. Kilbane was only four games away from equalling Wright's record of 70 consecutive competitive international starts. However this run ended after he was not selected for Ireland's crunch UEFA Euro 2012 qualification tie against Slovakia due to a back operation. He never played for Ireland again, and announced his retirement as a footballer in December 2012.

Media career
Kilbane obtained a degree in Professional Sports Writing and Broadcasting at Staffordshire University. Kilbane was enlisted by RTÉ Sport for their squad of pundits ahead of the 2010 FIFA World Cup in South Africa.
From 2012 he has been a studio analyst for UEFA Champions League and UEFA Europa League coverage on TV3 and 3e in Ireland, and is also a regular on Setanta Sports. On 7 April 2013, he made his first appearance as a studio pundit on the BBC One's Match of the Day 2. On 9 May 2013, he made his first appearance on the Guardian Football Weekly Extra podcast.

In 2014 Kilbane was part of the commentary team for the BBC at the 2014 FIFA World Cup in Brazil.

Since August 2016, Kilbane has had the role of co-presenter on the Off the Ball show on Newstalk radio in Ireland. Kilbane also provides commentary for the station's Premier League coverage. In 2020, Kilbane competed in the twelfth series of Dancing on Ice, alongside partner Brianne Delcourt.

Kilbane is married to  Dancing on Ice professional figure skater Brianne Delcourt they married in September 2020 in Haliburton, Ontario. They have a daughter Gracie, and Brianne is pregnant with their child and due to give birth in early 2021. Kilbane & Delcourt became engaged in February 2020 after being partners in the twelfth series of the show.

After relocating to Canada, Kevin took up a role as professional analyst on The Sports Network (TSN) during the COVID-delayed UEFA Euro 2020.

He is a patron of the Down's Syndrome Association, and in February 2015 sent a complaint to the FA over allegations that West Ham United fans had sung a chant mocking the condition.

Career statistics

Club

International

Honours
Preston North End
Football League Third Division: 1995–96

Individual
FAI Senior International Player of the Year: 2004

See also
 List of Republic of Ireland international footballers born outside the Republic of Ireland
 List of men's footballers with 100 or more international caps

References

External links

Republic of Ireland association footballers
Republic of Ireland international footballers
Republic of Ireland under-21 international footballers
Association football midfielders
Preston North End F.C. players
West Bromwich Albion F.C. players
Sunderland A.F.C. players
Everton F.C. players
Wigan Athletic F.C. players
Hull City A.F.C. players
Huddersfield Town A.F.C. players
Derby County F.C. players
Coventry City F.C. players
Premier League players
English Football League players
2002 FIFA World Cup players
English footballers
English people of Irish descent
1977 births
Living people
Association football utility players
FIFA Century Club
Alumni of Staffordshire University
English association football commentators
Footballers from Preston, Lancashire
Republic of Ireland expatriate association footballers